The Gherla Synagogue is a synagogue located in Gherla in northern Romania. The building was constructed in 1903 and was in danger of collapse in 2012 when fund raising was commenced to complete structural repairs.

History
The modern city of Gherla was founded by the Armenian community in 1700 with the approval bought from Vienna, with the consent of Emperor Leopold I. In the beginning the Jews were only permitted to live in the small villages surrounding the actual city. One of the villages, Iclod, even as early as 1772 had a large Jewish population, with a house of prayer and a cemetery. Many of the Jews who lived in Iclod went to work every day in Gherla. During the 1830s, the first Jews settled in Gherla. Initially they were only allowed to settle in one suburb, Candia, but after a while they were expelled. Only after the 1848 revolution were the Jews allowed to live in the city of Gherla proper. The congregation was established in the 1850s by which time the restrictions on settlement of Jews in town has been rescinded. The community grew at a gradual pace. By 1860s the congregation already had a kosher butcher, a synagogue and a mikvah (ritual bath). The cemetery was opened in the 1870, until then, the burials took place in the Jewish cemetery of Iclod. Rabbi Yitzhak Yosef ha-Kohen became the first official chief rabbi of Gherla's Jewish community in 1880, acting as the spiritual leader, religious instructor, and even shochet (kosher slaughterer) of the community, and under his guidance many religious institutions were set up. He served until his death in 1920. Following the death of Rabbi ha-Kohen, his son-in-law, Rabbi Avraham Shlomo Elias became the rabbi of Gherla. After his death in 1930, his son Jakov Samuel Elias took over the spiritual leadership of the congregation In 1944 he was deported with the rest of the Jewish population and murdered in a camp near Auschwitz in 1945.

The Jews of Gherla worked in various branches of industry and trade; several factories were owned by Jews. The largest of these was the distillery founded by Jakov Dov Feldmann, who employed many Jewish workers. At the turn of the twentieth century, Feldmann was the congregation's president. By 1903 there were multiple small synagogues operating in the city. That year, a large and elaborate synagogue was built to accommodate the increasing Jewish population. Religious life flourished, especially thanks to the construction of the new synagogue, the improving Jewish educational system, and the formation of a society which met at the synagogue to study the Talmud.

Around this time a number of rabbis moved to the city, notable among them the Hassidic rabbi Baruch Rubin, and small religious schools popped up in individual homes, leading to the establishment of a larger "Talmud Torah" school in 1922, which housed an elementary school. Other institutions formed as well, such as the Chevra Kadisha (burial society), several organizations which helped take care of the needy members of the community, and even a kind of a guest house for the poorer visitors in the city. A modern mikveh (ritual bath) facility was constructed on the banks of the Somes canal and inaugurated in 1925. By 1930, census figures show that there were 1037 Jews in Gherla. The presidents of the congregation between the two world wars were Samuel Teleki, a landowner and distiller; Simcha Klein, a landowner; and Albert Fischer, a furniture factory owner. During this period of thriving Jewish life, the Zionist movement which was sweeping through Transylvania attracted some followers in Gherla, and precipitated some meetings and events. The first Zionist organization in Gherla was established in 1919. The various Zionist youth groups, such as the Aviva and Barissia, as well as Betar, were
launched during the 1920s. The Zionist women were gathered in the WIZO (Women's International Zionist Organization). The non-Zionist Agudath Yisrael also had a local chapter. However, because the Jews of Gherla were Orthodox and at the time Zionism was shunned by the majority of traditional Jews, most of the community was less receptive or even openly hostile to Zionist ideology, and the movement did not gain as wide a following or as vibrant a cultural life as it did in some other Transylvanian cities. Nevertheless, some Zionists managed to reach leadership positions in the congregation. The highest point was reached by Albert Fischer who was also the congregation's president.

With the coming of World War II, and specifically the partition of Transylvania on August 28, 1940, everything changed. Gherla along with the rest of northern Transylvania became part of Hungary. The Hungarian government began to make life difficult for the Jews with anti-Semitic laws such as those that prohibited Jews from attending university or having government jobs.

Starting in 1942, Gherla became the headquarters of a labor service drafting board. In June 1942, the board conscripted 424 Jews for labor service from Cluj, Gherla and surroundings. The draftees were assigned to labor service battalions and sent to the Eastern Front in Ukraine where most of them perished. Those that survived and returned were subsequently sent to Dachau where a large majority perished.

In 1943 and 1944 more Jews from Gherla were conscripted to labor service, but the majority of them were deployed within Hungary, most of these labor servicemen survived. Of note are the actions of Imre Revicky, a colonel in the Hungarian army, who tried to deal more compassionately with the Jews. Despite Revicky's job overseeing Jewish labor; he punished his subordinates for beating the workers, risking his own life repeatedly and saving the lives of hundreds of Jews in this way. He is a righteous among nations at Yad Vashem. Following the beginning of Germany's occupation of Hungary, on March 19, 1944, the Jews of Gherla were subjected to the Nazi's "Final Solution" program. 
Marked with yellow stars and expropriated, the Jews were forced into the local brickyard ghetto on May 3, 1944. On the same night, the Jews who lived in villages in the Gherla and Chiochis districts were also taken to this ghetto where 1600 Jews were crammed. The ghettoization was carried out under the immediate command of Mayor Lajos Tamasi, Police Chief Erno Bereczki and Police Chief Inspector Andor Ivanyi. On April 26, all of them had taken part in a secret conference chaired by Laszlo Endre, Hungary's State Secretary in the Ministry of the Interior. On May 18, 1944, the population of the ghetto of Gherla was loaded onto cattle car trains and 
transferred to the ghetto of Cluj. They were all deported to Auschwitz-Birkenau in the transport of May 25, where the overwhelming majority was murdered in gas chambers or through the harsh conditions. A single exempted Jewish family, consisting of the First World War disabled veteran Hillel Pataki, his wife and his unmarried son, were allowed to remain in Gherla, but they were on house arrest, could not leave the house without permission and they had to wear a white armband for identification. The family succeeded in saving most of the synagogue's Torah scrolls.

When the war ended, only about 40 Jews returned home and they reestablished the community. A shelter and communal kitchen, which initially was supported by the American Jewish Joint Distribution Committee, was able to provide meals every day for desperate refugees. In 1945, the survivors renovated the synagogue, which had been used as a warehouse for confiscated Jewish owned property. The Hassidic Rabbi Rubin's son-in-law, Mozes Frischman, was among the survivor's and he became the congregation's postwar rabbi. By 1947, following an influx of displaced refugees, 210 Jews lived in the city.

After the formation of the State of Israel, many started to immigrate to the new Jewish homeland. By 1956, the congregation had 140 members and by 1966 the membership had declined to 21. In 1971 there were only 4 Jewish families in the city. By 2002, there was only one observant Jew, Zoltan Blum a Holocaust survivor, who was named honorary citizen of Gherla in June 2015. Mr. Blum is still being solicited by school children and various organizations to talk about his Holocaust experience.

Since 2008, many of the former Jewish residents of Gherla who now live in Israel, United States, Canada and Australia have been actively trying to find some creative solutions to saving the beautiful synagogue of Gherla which has been neglected for decades. They formed an organization, "The Jewish Community of Gherla" with members from all over the world. The president is Alexandru Sommer, a resident of Gherla of Jewish descent, whose grandmother was murdered at Auschwitz; he is actively involved in maintaining and providing access and safekeeping the Jewish Cemetery and the Synagogue. In the spring of 2016, the organization raised enough funds to build a Holocaust Memorial Monument on the grounds of the synagogue. In addition to being a memorial to the 1600 Jews that were deported from the Gherla ghetto, and memorializing the names of the 1040 known victims, the monument is also intended to raise awareness about the fate of the synagogue and be a catalyst for fundraising efforts to repair the Gherla Synagogue.

References

Synagogues in Romania
Synagogues completed in 1903
Buildings and structures in Cluj County